Frank Pagelsdorf (born 5 February 1958 in Hanover) is a German football manager and former player.

Coaching career
He was manager of Hamburger SV from 1997 to 2001. He has also had a brief time as manager in UAE.

References

External links
 
 Frank Pagelsdorf at immerunioner.de 

1958 births
Living people
Footballers from Hanover
German footballers
Association football midfielders
Bundesliga players
2. Bundesliga players
TSV Havelse players
Hannover 96 players
Arminia Bielefeld players
Borussia Dortmund players
German football managers
Hamburger SV managers
FC Hansa Rostock managers
1. FC Union Berlin managers
Bundesliga managers
2. Bundesliga managers
Al-Nasr SC (Dubai) managers
VfL Osnabrück managers